The tomb of Liliana Crociati de Szaszak is a tomb in La Recoleta Cemetery, Buenos Aires, Argentina, known for its unusual design.

26-year-old Liliana Crociati de Szaszak (1944–1970) was in Innsbruck, Austria on 26 February 1970, when her hotel was struck by an avalanche, killing her. Her tomb was designed by her mother in the Neo-Gothic style, in sharp contrast to the other tombs in the cemetery. Adjacent to the tomb stands a dais adorned with a plaque containing an Italian-language poem by her father, and topped by a life-size green bronze statue of Crociati de Szaszak in her wedding dress, by sculptor Wíeredovol Viladrich. Following the death of Crociati's dog Sabú, a bronze statue of the dog, also by Viladrich, was added, with Crociati's hand resting on the dog's head.

"A Mia Figlia", poem on the dais adjacent to the tomb

References

Buildings and structures in Buenos Aires
Mausoleums in Argentina
Burials at La Recoleta Cemetery